D. or d. may refer to, usually as an abbreviation:
 Don (honorific), a form of address in Spain, Portugal, Italy, and their former overseas empires, usually given to nobles or other individuals of high social rank.
 Date of death, as an abbreviation.
 District of Columbia Department of Transportation, whose logo is "d."
 Schubert Thematic Catalogue, also known as the Deutsch catalogue (or D.), a numbered list of all compositions by Franz Schubert compiled by Otto Erich Deutsch.
 a penny, from the Latin denarius.

See also
 D (disambiguation), other meanings of "D"
 D, the letter